Vijay Kumar Abrol, (born on 20 December 1950), better known by his pen name Zahid Abrol, is a well-versed Indian Urdu poet. He has done 'the first-ever Urdu translation' of the 12th century Sufi-poet Baba Farid's shlokas and shabads and that too in verse.

Poetic career
ZAHID Abrol'S'Andha Khuda' was his first collection published in 1978 followed by 'Ek Saf-ha Purnam' in 1986. His recent publication is the poetic translated version – 'Faridnama' – exhibits the original Gurmukhi version, its Roman transcript, Urdu translation in verse in Urdu and Devnagari scripts in a well produced volume and has won accolades from experts. This way he has reproduced tributes paid to Sheikh Baba Farid's poetry in all the three languages.

In his recent work 'Faridnama', Zahid Abrol has rendered the poetic translation of Farid bani into Urdu and presented it in both Urdu and Devnagri scripts. This is remarkably a great achievement as in the process, he has not deviated from the tenor and texture of the original composition. At some places, the Punjabi verses of Baba Farid defy attempts at easy comprehension and facile understanding. These require deep knowledge of the syntax of Punjabi language, rural imagery, concept of Sufi order, metaphysical metaphors and pithiness of expression. It is not possible for a devout reader to comprehend the meanings without bringing about a qualitative change in the atmosphere of his mind. On his part, Zahid Abrol has disciplined his mind thoroughly so as to remain within the bounds of close textual reading. He appears to have completely identified himself with the philosophy contained in the original work. It is very rare that a classic is translated in another language by retaining its linguistic pattern dexterously. This can happen only when the mind of the translator is fully attuned to the symphony of the original poetic diction. The words emerged from the inner recesses of his mind and took the form of rhyming verses in his work Faridnama; angels dictate him when he takes pen in his hands. Faridnama is indeed a marvel in translation.

Personal life
Zahid Abrol is a bank manager by profession. He is married to Rita Abrol and they currently reside at Una, Himachal Pradesh. They have one son (Anees Abrol) and two daughters (Neha Abrol and Rabia Abrol). Being a hard-core secularist, he has named his son 'Anees' and daughter 'Rabia'. "I like the poetry of Mir Anees, so I named my son after him. Why not name our children like that, why can’t Kulsum be called Kusum and vice-versa?", he asks. He also feels that if the poems of Dr Iqbal are introduced in Hindi textbooks for children, it would bring the next generations closer. My job does not give me a lot of spare time, so it took me two years to complete the translation of these shlokas and shabads all of which are a part of the Guru Granth Sahib", he said.

His publications
Andha Khuda – Jalandhar, Deepak Publishers  - (1978)
Ek Saf-ha Purnam – Hoshiarpur, Charvak Publications - (1986)
Faridnama - Poetical Translation of Shiekh Farid's Punjabi Verses in Urdu and Hindi Scripts  -[Delhi, Ajanta Books International,  – (2003)
Darya Darya Sahil Sahil - Urdu Ghazals in Urdu and Hindi separately - (2014/2015) 
Khwabon Ke Ped Taley - Urdu Nazams in Urdu and Hindi separately - (2016) 
A Three-Step Journey - Poetic translations of Zahid Abrol's selected Urdu Poetry into English by Dr. Lalit Mohan Sharma - (2016).

References

Urdu-language poets from India
Living people
1950 births
Panjab University alumni
People from Chamba district
Poets from Himachal Pradesh
Indian male poets